A reef knoll is a land-based landform that comprises an immense pile of calcareous material that accumulated on a previously existing ancient sea floor. At the time of its accumulation it may have had enough structure from organisms such as sponges to have been free-standing and to withstand the sea currents as material accumulated, and was likely an atoll. Another possibility is the remains of deep water coral.  Such structures are thus often fossil-rich.

A bioherm is a sedimentary rocky landform  enclosed or surrounded by rock of different origin. A biostrome  is a distinctly bedded or broadly lenticular sedimentary rocky landform. Krumbein defines these terms as types of stromatolites: "Distinctly bedded, widely extensive, blanketlike build-ups are biostromes. Nodular, biscuit-like, dome-shaped or
columnar stromatolites are also referred to as bioherms".

England

Examples on the Derbyshire/Staffordshire border include Thorpe Cloud and Bunster Hill in southern Dovedale, and also Chrome Hill and Parkhouse Hill at the northern end.

These structures are often most clearly seen where the surrounding rocks are much softer and so can be preferentially eroded. All the Derbyshire examples quoted lie at the edge of the limestone areas; Chrome and Parkhouse lie at the divide between limestone and the much softer shale. 

Examples in the Yorkshire Dales lie on the downthrow side (north) of the Mid Craven Fault. There is one set located around Thorpe (Skelterton, Butter Haw, Stebden, Elbolton, Thorpe Kail, Myra Bank and Hartlington Kail); one set located around Malham (Burns Hill, Cawden, and Wedber); and a set around Settle (High Hill and Scaleber).

It was once proposed that in Lancashire, reef knolls could be seen between the villages of Worston and Downham near Clitheroe.

See also
Waulsortian mudmound

References

External links
British Geological Survey website, on Chrome, Parkhouse and Derbyshire atolls

Landforms